The 2003 Categoría Primera A season was the 55th season of Colombia's top-flight football league. The season started on 2 February and concluded on 21 December 2003. Independiente Medellín were the defending champions, having won the 2002 Finalización tournament.

Torneo Apertura
The Torneo Apertura (officially the 2003 Copa Mustang I for sponsorship reasons) was the first tournament of the season. The tournament began on February 2 and ended on June 8.

First stage

Standings

Semifinals

The second phase of the tournament consisted of two groups of four teams each. This was played by the best eight teams from the first phase of the tournament. The winners of each group qualified for the Finals.

Group A

Standings

Results

Group B

Standings

Results

Finals

Top goalscorers

Torneo Finalización
The Torneo Finalización (officially the 2003 Copa Mustang II for sponsorship reasons) was the second tournament of the season. The tournament began on July 13 and ended on December 21.

First stage

Standings

Semifinals

Group A

Standings

Results

Group B

Standings

Results

Finals

Top goalscorers

Aggregate table
An aggregate table including all games that a team played during the year was used to determine berths to both the Copa Libertadores and the Copa Sudamericana. The best-placed non-champion qualified for the 2004 Copa Libertadores along with both champions of the season, while the second and third best-placed non-champions qualified for the 2004 Copa Sudamericana.

Relegation

Rules for classification: 1st average; 2nd wins; 3rd goal difference; 4th number of goals scored; 5th away goals scored.

External links 
Copa Mustang Official Page
Dimayor Official Page
Colombia 2003 RSSSF

Categoría Primera A seasons
1
Col